Morotripta argillacea is a moth in the family Autostichidae. It was described by Wolfram Mey in 2011. It is found in South Africa's Western Cape province.

References

Moths described in 2011
Symmocinae